Stony Brook, also known as Stoney Brook, is a tributary of the Millstone River in Hunterdon and Mercer counties, New Jersey, in the United States.

Course

It flows south through the Amwell Lake Wildlife Management Area. It flows southeast, flowing parallel to Route 31 while it receives Peters Brook and Woodsville Brook. It receives a tributary from Sourland Mountain, and crosses Pennington-Hopewell Road. It flows through the Hopewell Valley Country Club and the Stony Brook–Millstone Watershed Association's nature reserve, and then receives the Stony Brook Branch. From there, it flows between Bristol-Myers Squibb and the Baldwin State Wildlife Management Area, receiving Baldwins Creek. It then flows through Kunkel Park and receives Lewis Brook. It then turns east, flowing through Old Mill Road County Park and Rosedale Park, where it receives Honey Branch. It then flows through a mountainous area with several large meanders, and turns south near Coventry Farm Park. 

It flows through Princeton Open Space Acquisition and then crosses Route 206. It then flows parallel to Quaker Road (CR-533) until it reaches the Delaware and Raritan Canal, where it turns northeast.

Tributaries
Baldwins Creek
Duck Pond Run
Honey Branch
Lewis Brook
Peters Brook
Stony Brook Branch
Woodsville Brook

Sister tributaries
Beden Brook
Bear Brook
Cranbury Brook
Devils Brook
Shallow Brook
Harrys Brook
Heathcote Brook
Indian Run Brook
Little Bear Brook
Millstone Brook
Peace Brook
Rocky Brook
Royce Brook
Simonson Brook
Six Mile Run
Ten Mile Run
Van Horn Brook

See also
List of rivers of New Jersey

References

External links

U.S. Geological Survey: NJ stream gaging stations
USGS Coordinates in Google Maps

Rivers of Mercer County, New Jersey
Rivers of Hunterdon County, New Jersey
Tributaries of the Raritan River
Rivers of New Jersey